Kevin Barry Fallon  (born 3 December 1948) is an English-born football coach residing in New Zealand. He is the father of New Zealand international footballer Rory Fallon and former coach of the Cook Islands national football team but did not manage any official games for them.

Career

Fallon spent most of his playing career outside of New Zealand at Sligo Rovers of Ireland. Fallon ended his career in NZ in 1979 with the now defunct Gisborne City. 

Fallon was assistant coach to the John Adshead-led New Zealand national team, which qualified for the 1982 FIFA World Cup. Fallon took sole charge of the New Zealand side in May 1985 but failed to qualify for the 1986 FIFA World Cup.  New Zealand won 19, drew 11 and lost 22 of his 52 games in charge.

In 1999 he managed hosts New Zealand at the FIFA U-17 World Championship of 1999 to third in Group A.

In 2001 he managed the professional team the Football Kingz FC. In 18 games managing the Football Kingz FC he won twice.

Also in 2001 he allegedly racially abused an opposing team when he admitted that he said “I told them to go back to the jungle and eat their bananas", for which he later apologised, and admitted to saying to a teenage opponent that "You’re [expletive] diving all over the place like a big tart. Like your Mum."   

In September 2008 Auckland Grammar pulled out of the final with Mount Albert Grammar School after allegations Kevin Fallon "man-handled" a player during a brawl. 

In the 2008 New Year Honours, Fallon was appointed a Member of the New Zealand Order of Merit for services to soccer.

In August 2009 he was banned for a season because of complaints he accused ref Alan Marriott of being biased.

In September 2012 a complaint was made by a parent that he made offensive comments to a rival player when coaching Mount Albert Grammar School.

In May 2013 Fallon was banned from making on-field decisions after complaints about his behaviour. 

In July 2014, Fallon was dismissed from Mount Albert Grammar School for breaking the school's sporting code of conduct.

In September 2018 Fallon was announced as head coach for the Cook Islands national football team. He signed a contract for two years but did not coach any competitive games for them.

References

Hilton, T. (1991) An association with soccer. Auckland: The New Zealand Football Association. . pp. 88, 91

Living people
League of Ireland players
Sligo Rovers F.C. players
New Zealand association footballers
New Zealand people of English descent
New Zealand national football team managers
Gisborne City AFC players
English people of Irish descent
New Zealand people of Irish descent
1948 births
Members of the New Zealand Order of Merit
Association football central defenders
New Zealand association football coaches
Cook Islands national football team managers